Cordell Volson (born July 20, 1998) is an American football guard for the Cincinnati Bengals of the National Football League (NFL). He played college football at North Dakota State.

Early life and high school
Volson grew up in Balfour, North Dakota, a town with a population of 27, and attended Drake-Anamoose High School. He played offensive line, defensive line, tight end, fullback, linebacker, punter, and kicker on the school's nine-man football team. Volson committed to play college football at North Dakota State over offers from Wyoming and North Dakota.

College career
Volson redshirted his true freshman season at North Dakota State. He played mostly on special teams as a redshirt freshman and sophomore. He was named a starter going into his redshirt junior season and was named first-team All-Missouri Valley Football Conference (MVFC) after starting all 16 of NDSU's games as the team won the 2020 NCAA Division I Football Championship Game. He was a consensus FCS All-American selection during his redshirt senior season, which was shortened and played in the spring of 2021 due to the COVID-19 pandemic in the United States. Volson decided to utilize the extra year of eligibility granted to college athletes who played in the 2020 season due to the coronavirus pandemic and return to NDSU for a sixth season.

Professional career

Volson was drafted by the Cincinnati Bengals in the fourth round (136th overall) of the 2022 NFL Draft.

References

External links
 Cincinnati Bengals bio
North Dakota State Bison bio

Living people
American football offensive tackles
Players of American football from North Dakota
North Dakota State Bison football players
People from McHenry County, North Dakota
Cincinnati Bengals players
1998 births